The 1999 Northeast Conference men's basketball tournament was held in March. The tournament featured the league's top eight seeds. Mount St. Mary's won the championship, their second, and received the conference's automatic bid to the 1999 NCAA Tournament.

Format
The NEC Men’s Basketball Tournament consisted of an eight-team playoff format with all games played at the Spiro Sports Center in Staten Island, NY.

Bracket

All-tournament team
Tournament MVP in bold.

References

Northeast Conference men's basketball tournament
Tournament
Northeast Conference men's basketball tournament